Abraham Jacob Multer (December 24, 1900 – November 4, 1986) was an American lawyer, jurist, and politician who served ten terms as a Democratic member of the United States House of Representatives from New York from 1947 to 1967.

Biography 
Born in New York City, the son of Max and Emma (née Rock) Multer, he graduated from City College of New York in 1921 and Brooklyn Law School in 1922. He served in the United States Coast Guard Reserve from 1943 until 1945 and the United States Coast Guard Auxiliary.

Congress 
He was elected to Congress in 1947 to fill the vacancy caused by the resignation of Leo F. Rayfiel and served from November 4, 1947, until his resignation on December 31, 1967 after election to the New York Supreme Court on November 7, 1967, where he served from January 1, 1968, until January 1, 1977.

He then served as special referee in the Brooklyn Appellate Division, from 1979–1984.

Family 
He married Bertha Leff in 1925, and they had two sons, Robert and Howard.

Death 
He died in West Hartford, Connecticut.

See also

List of Jewish members of the United States Congress

References

 Retrieved on 2009-03-12

External links
Abraham J. Multer Papers from the American Jewish Archives
Multer genealogy including Abraham Multer and his family

1900 births
1986 deaths
20th-century American military personnel
20th-century American politicians
20th-century American judges
20th-century American lawyers
20th-century American Jews
Politicians from New York City
American Reform Jews
Jewish members of the United States House of Representatives
Democratic Party members of the United States House of Representatives from New York (state)
New York Supreme Court Justices
City College of New York alumni
Brooklyn Law School alumni
Yeshiva University alumni
Lawyers from New York City
United States Coast Guard reservists
United States Coast Guard auxiliarists
United States Coast Guard personnel